NUKU Theatre (formerly Estonian State Puppet Theatre and Estonian Puppet and Youth Theatre) is an Estonian theatre located in Tallinn. The institution focuses on puppetry. It is currently the only professional puppet and visual theatre in Estonia.

The theatre was founded in 1952 by Ferdinand Veike and has been directed by Joonas Tartu since 2013.

The theatre building is also home to a puppetry museum.

References

External links

Theatres in Estonia
Theatres in Tallinn
Culture in Tallinn
Puppet theaters